Liam Ryan (born 2 October 1996) is a professional Australian rules footballer playing for the West Coast Eagles in the Australian Football League (AFL). He is a small forward who is known widely for his vertical leap and high-marking ability.

Early life and junior football
Ryan is from Geraldton, Western Australia. His father Darren "Snotty" Ryan played WAFL football for Claremont. Ryan began his football career with Rovers in the Great Northern Football League (GNFL). In 2016 he moved to Perth to play for the Subiaco Football Club in the West Australian Football League (WAFL). Beginning in the reserves, he was moved up to the seniors after only four games, and subsequently kicked 40 goals from 16 senior games. In the 2017 WAFL season, Ryan won the Bernie Naylor Medal as the competition's leading goal-kicker. He kicked 73 goals from 23 games.

AFL career

Early career: 2018-2019
2018: First season and premiership

After his remarkable form in the WAFL in 2017 as a 21-year-old, Ryan was drafted into the AFL by West Coast with their third selection and twenty-sixth overall in the 2017 national draft. Ryan continued his form into the his first preseason at the club, and was selected to make his AFL debut in the game versus  at Optus Stadium in the opening round of the 2018 season. On debut, he kicked his first AFL goal along with nine disposals.

Ryan was selected to play the following week and kicked six goals in the next two matches at AFL level, before injuring his ankle while kicking a final quarter goal during the Round 3 match against Geelong. The injury was predicted to keep Ryan out for the following 12 weeks.

Upon his return from injury in the Round 13 clash against Sydney, Ryan struggled to recapture his early season form, only kicking two goals in his first three games returning from injury. His brief return to the side, however, came to an end when he was hospitalised after crashing his car into a tree in the early morning on July 2. Ryan missed the following week of football, and was handed a two-match suspension by the club. Ryan subsequently played the next week in the WAFL, with senior coach Adam Simpson later revealing he had been under the influence of alcohol when he crashed his car.

His first WAFL game since being drafted saw Ryan kick three goals for East Perth against Swan Districts in Round 15 of the state competition. Ryan played the next two WAFL games, and despite only kicking a combined two goals in those next two games, he was recalled to the AFL side for the Round 20 Western Derby against Fremantle.

His return to the senior side saw a resurgence in form to finish the 2018 season, kicking three goals upon his return against Fremantle, and holding his spot in the team heading into the 2018 Finals Series. Ryan kicked three goals in the first two finals, which was enough to hold his spot heading into the 2018 Grand Final against Collingwood. Just two days before the Grand Final, it was announced that Ryan had been charged with drink driving over the car crash earlier that year in July, with a court date set for October 8.

Ryan had a mixed start to the Grand Final, sending Collingwood defender Brayden Maynard sprawling after a fierce bump, before dropping a relatively simple chest mark 50 metres out from goal, and missing in front of goal twice in the second half. However, Ryan was able to redeem himself from his previous mistakes, when he took a strong pack mark with two minutes to go in the game, played on and kicked the ball inside 50 to Dom Sheed in the forward pocket. Sheed would go on to kick the goal and give the Eagles the lead they needed to win the 2018 premiership. Ryan became just the second player in West Coast Eagles history to win a premiership in their first year, alongside Paul Harding in 1992.

Ryan faced the Armadale Magistrates Court on October 8, pleading guilty to a charge of driving with a blood alcohol reading exceeding 0.08. As a result, Ryan was fined $1700 and had his drivers license suspended for 18 months.

Statistics
Statistics are correct to the end of round 8, 2022

|- style="background-color: #EAEAEA"
| scope=row bgcolor=F0E68C | 2018# || 
| 1 || 13 || 20 || 15 || 113 || 37 || 150 || 37 || 25 || 1.5 || 1.2 || 8.7 || 2.8 || 11.5 || 2.8 || 1.9 || 0
|-
! scope="row" style="text-align:center" | 2019
|style="text-align:center;"|
| 1 || 24 || 30 || 19 || 211 || 70 || 281 || 72 || 51 || 1.3 || 0.8 || 8.8 || 2.9 || 11.7 || 3.0 || 2.1 || 0
|- style="background-color: #EAEAEA"
! scope="row" style="text-align:center" | 2020
|style="text-align:center;"|
| 1 || 18 || 26 || 16 || 140 || 54 || 194 || 66 || 32 || 1.4 || 0.9 || 7.8 || 3.0 || 10.8 || 3.7 || 1.8 || 1
|-
! scope="row" style="text-align:center" | 2021
|style="text-align:center;"|
| 1 || 14 || 24 || 10 || 116 || 28 || 144 || 55 || 21 || 1.7 || 0.7 || 8.3 || 2.0 || 10.3 || 3.9 || 1.5 || 2
|- style="background-color: #EAEAEA"
! scope="row" style="text-align:center" | 2022
|style="text-align:center;"|
| 1 || 7 || 11 || 6 || 59 || 10 || 69 || 26 || 13 || 1.6 || 0.9 || 8.4 || 1.4 || 9.9 || 3.7 || 1.9 || TBA
|- class="sortbottom"
! colspan=3| Career
! 76 !! 111 !! 66 !! 639 !! 199 !! 838 !! 256 !! 142 !! 1.5 !! 0.9 !! 8.4 !! 2.6 !! 11.0 !! 3.4 !! 1.9 !! 3
|}

Notes

References

External links

Liam Ryan player profile page at WAFL FootyFacts

1996 births
Living people
West Coast Eagles players
West Coast Eagles Premiership players
Subiaco Football Club players
Indigenous Australian players of Australian rules football
Australian rules footballers from Geraldton
East Perth Football Club players
All-Australians (AFL)
One-time VFL/AFL Premiership players